Ɓeele (also known as Bele, Àbéélé, Bellawa) is an endangered Afro-Asiatic language spoken in a few villages in Bauchi State, Nigeria.

References

External links 
OLAC resources in and about the Beele language

West Chadic languages
Languages of Nigeria
Endangered Afroasiatic languages